Below is a list of countries which have signed and ratified one or more international treaties protecting rights related to copyright. 
Related rights protect performers, producers of sound recordings (phonograms) and broadcasting organisations. In some countries these rights are known simply as copyright, while other countries distinguish them from authors' rights: in either case, their international protection is distinct from 
the protection of literary and artistic works under the Berne Convention and other treaties.

Treaties

In addition, a Protection of Broadcasts and Broadcasting Organizations Treaty has been proposed, but not yet signed.

As of December 2019, Eritrea, Marshall Islands, Nauru, Palau, San Marino, and WTO Observer countries Iran, Iraq, Ethiopia, Somalia, and South Sudan are not a party to any copyright convention.

Maps

List
The list below was taken from details supplied by WIPO and the WTO (see references): they are correct as of 2012-10-15, and include some accessions after that date. Dates quoted are the date on which the treaty came into effect for a given country.

See also 
List of parties to international copyright treaties
List of parties to international patent treaties
List of parties to international trademark treaties
List of parties to international design rights treaties

International organizations 
World Intellectual Property Organization
World Trade Organization
UNESCO
International Labour Organization

References

External links

Treaty texts 
Rome Convention for the Protection of Performers, Producers of Phonograms and Broadcasting Organisations
Convention for the Protection of Producers of Phonograms Against Unauthorized Duplication of Their Phonograms
Convention Relating to the Distribution of Programme–Carrying Signals Transmitted by Satellite
Agreement on Trade-Related Aspects of Intellectual Property Rights
WIPO Performances and Phonograms Treaty
Beijing Treaty on Audiovisual Performances

 
Copyright